{{DISPLAYTITLE:C30H44O7}}
The molecular formula C30H44O7 (molar mass: 516.66 g/mol, exact mass: 516.3087 u) may refer to:

 Angustific acid B
 Cucurbitacin D
 Ganoderic acid